Unakkenna Venum Sollu is a 2015 Indian Tamil-language horror film produced by N. Shanmuga Sundaram and the directorial debut of Srinath Ramalingam. The film stars Deepak Paramesh, Jaqlene Prakash, Gunalan Morgan and Anu. It was released on 24 September 2015 in India.

Plot 
Lovers Karthik and Pooja are in a live-in relationship. When Pooja realises that she is pregnant, her friend advises to go for an abortion, which Karthik opposes. Karthik loses his job and goes to Singapore to earn money, Pooja delivers the child and leaves it at an orphanage, then claims to Karthik that their child died. The couple part ways, Pooja marries Shiva and gives birth to his child. When Pooja and Shiva arrive at Chennai to treat their son, who has a lethal disease, they experience paranormal activity in their guest house. Mathew, an exorcist, says Daisy, who is Pooja's abandoned daughter, is the ghost. It is learnt that Daisy is adopted from the orphanage by Judy a psychologically affected woman and she is unable to take care of Daisy and so she dies as a baby. The rest of the film tells deals with how Mathew sends back Daisy to the other world.

Cast 
Deepak Paramesh as Karthik
Jaqlene Prakash as Pooja
Gunalan Morgan as Shiva
Anu as Daisy
Mime Gopi as Mathew

Production 
Unakkenna Venum Sollu is the directorial debut of Srinath Ramalingam. It was originally titled Daisy, but was later retitled Unakkenna Venum Sollu after the song from Yennai Arindhaal. Srinath said he chose this title to give the film a wider reach, and added, "Since [Unakkenna Venum Sollu] is the popular melody of Ajith in Yennai Arindhaal, we thought this would be appropriate for the film as it deals with the relationship of a father and daughter." Producer N. Shanmuga Sundaram also served as the B-camera director and co-wrote the script. Principal photography took place in Chennai from July to September 2014 over the course of 45 working days. The film was produced by Juna Pictures.

Release and reception 
Unakkenna Venum Sollu was released on 24 September 2015 in India, and in Singapore the following day. Auraa Cinemas distributed the film worldwide. Sify said, "Debutant director Srinath Ramalingam’s [Unakkenna Venum Sollu] is a sincere attempt but has taken audience for granted as the execution falls flat." M. Suganth of The Times of India rated it 2 out of 5 saying, "Despite being a horror film, [Unakkenna Venum Sollu] is a largely bland film, with no real scary moments". Sudhir Srinivasan of The Hindu said, "Technically, [Unakkenna Venum Sollu] is quite refined. It’s all there: good background music (Siva Saravanan), a lot of well-composed shots in the dark (Manish Murthy)... The acting — especially Jaqlene Prakash, as the haunted Pooja — is in place too. So, what is the problem? The important parts of the film, like the dialogues, and the story."

References

External links 
 

2010s Tamil-language films
2015 directorial debut films
2015 films
2015 horror films
Indian horror films
Indian pregnancy films